Abiodun Baruwa (born 16 November 1974) is a Nigerian former professional footballer who played as a goalkeeper.

Club career
Born in Abuja, Baruwa started his career at Kano Pillars. He also had spells with Iwuanyanwu Nationale and Shooting Stars FC, being the first choice goalkeeper during 1996 African Cup of Champions Clubs where his club was runner-up after losing to Zamalek on penalties.

In 1997, Baruwa was bought by Sion, where he was a backup to Fabrice Borer. In the next season, he moved to Sturm Graz only appearing once as a reserve for Kazimierz Sidorczuk. He stayed with the club until 2001 without making any further appearance and being relegated to third-choice after Josef Schicklgruber was appointed the first choice.

In January 2003, Baruwa was signed by Barry Town on a short-term deal, winning both 2002–03 Welsh Premier League and 2002–03 Welsh Cup. During his stay, in a match against Bangor City, he suffered racial abuse and was confronted by an opposition fan in the pitch.

After failing to get a work permit to 2003–04 season, Baruwa left Barry Town and in October 2003 joined Dagenham & Redbridge. Also without a work permit, he could not be paid by the Conference National club. Unable to oust Tony Roberts from the starting side, Baruwa made a single Conference appearance as a substitute in September 2004, before being released in the same month.

In the same year, Baruwa was signed by Conference South side Hornchurch, making a single appearance at a 5–2 loss against Boston United in a FA Cup match on 13 November 2004.

International career
Baruwa was a stand-by player for Nigeria under-23 at the 1996 Summer Olympics when his team won the gold medal. With the Nigeria national team, he was selected for the 1998 FIFA World Cup.

Age controversy
Zimbabwe alleged that Baruwa, who played during 1996 Summer Olympics qualification, was in fact born on 7 February 1969 as stated in a match program from 1991 Nigerian FA Cup final when Baruwa was a Kano Pillars player. Nigeria faced disqualification from the Olympic Games, but FIFA turned down the Zimbabwe allegation. During his stint at Barry Town, he was cited as a 33-year-old goalkeeper, meaning he was born in 1969.

Honours
Iwuanyanwu Nationale
Nigerian Premier League: 1993

Shooting Stars
Nigerian Premier League: 1995

Sturm Graz
Austrian Football Bundesliga: 1998–99
ÖFB-Cup: 1998–99
Austrian Supercup: 1998, 1999

Barry Town
Welsh Premier League: 2002–03
Welsh Cup 2002–03

Nigeria
Summer Olympics: 1996 (stand-by player)

References

External links
 

1974 births
Living people
People from Abuja
Nigerian footballers
Association football goalkeepers
Nigeria international footballers
1998 FIFA World Cup players
Swiss Super League players
Austrian Football Bundesliga players
Cymru Premier players
Kano Pillars F.C. players
Heartland F.C. players
Shooting Stars S.C. players
FC Sion players
SK Sturm Graz players
Barry Town United F.C. players
Dagenham & Redbridge F.C. players
Hornchurch F.C. players
Nigerian expatriate footballers
Nigerian expatriate sportspeople in Switzerland
Expatriate footballers in Switzerland
Nigerian expatriate sportspeople in Austria
Expatriate footballers in Austria
Nigerian expatriate sportspeople in Wales
Expatriate footballers in Wales
Nigerian expatriate sportspeople in England
Expatriate footballers in England
Yoruba sportspeople